A janitor (American English), also known as a custodian, porter, cleanser, cleaner or caretaker, is a person who cleans and maintains buildings. In some cases, they will also carry out maintenance and security duties. A similar position, but usually with more managerial duties and not including cleaning, is occupied by building superintendents in the United States and Canada and by site managers in schools in the United Kingdom. Cleaning is one of the most commonly outsourced services.

Etymology
The word janitor derives from the Latin "ianitor", meaning doorkeeper or porter, itself from "ianua", meaning door, entrance or gate. This derives from "Janus", the Roman god of doors, gates and portals.

Its first recorded use meaning "caretaker of a building, man employed to see that rooms are kept clean" was in 1708.

Occupational tasks
Most of the work performed by janitors and building cleaners is indoors. Office buildings are usually cleaned when they are vacant, so most of the office janitorial staff work during the evening. The work can be physically taxing and sometimes dirty and unpleasant.
General janitor duties often include the following tasks:
 Cleaning and restocking bathrooms
 Sinks
 Toilets
 Urinals
 Scrubbing feces from toilet, floor and stall
 Floor cleaning, refinishing, and polishing (sweeping, mopping, scrubbing and buffing)
 Clearing garbage bins
 Restocking restroom paper products and other supplies such as feminine products and air fresheners
 Cleaning mirrors
 Cleaning floors (mopping, sweeping, polishing)
 Carpet cleaning (dry method, extraction, steam and bonnet)
 Cleaning carpeting (vacuuming)
 Cleaning stainless steel and other special surfaces
 Clearing lunch room/kitchen
 Cleaning tables in cubicles, meeting rooms, etc.
 Window washing 
 Scrubbing concrete
 Emptying trash and recycling bins
 Unlocking and locking buildings at the beginning and end of the day
 Operation of building systems (turning on and off lights, setting thermostats, etc.) In some places, this may include testing/maintaining/setting building safety/security systems (fire alarms, burglar alarms, surveillance cameras, etc.) 
 Stripping and waxing floors using floor buffer
 Cleaning air-conditioner vents
 Crime scene cleaning (requires being fully certified and pay scale starts from $300.00 to $700.00+ an hour)
 Spot cleaning (generally spills – coffee for instance)
 Sanitization
 Room and event setups (tables and chairs, audio video equipment, etc.) (college/schools, etc.)
 Raising and lowering flags (schools)
 Removing graffiti or other forms of vandalism
 Minor maintenance work, such as: changing light bulbs and filters, replacing ceiling tiles, doing small repairs, fixing small leaks, performing testing and monitoring of building equipment, etc. In some places, other people may do these maintenance tasks.
 Outdoor work, such as: cleaning walkways, litter pickup, mowing lawns, tending to landscape plantings, leaf cleanup, snow removal, etc. In some places, groundskeepers or a separate company may do outdoor work.
 Porterage (internal deliveries; movement of equipment or people in hospitals, colleges, etc.) 
 Unclogging blocked drains and toilets  
 Removing vomit, urine, and feces from public areas

Pay scale
In 2010, the median pay of a janitor working in the US was $10.68 per hour. The yearly salary could grow by 11% according to the statistics of 2010.

Office cleaning

Office cleaning staff perform many of the same duties as janitors. However the tasks are divided among different members. Additional tasks include:

 watering plants (pruning as well)
 cleaning sinks, refrigerators, microwaves and toasters in office kitchens; clearing recycling and garbage bins
 dusting furniture and computer equipment (monitors and desk area, but excluding keyboards) and tables

Outsourcing
Cleaning is one of the most commonly outsourced services. Some of the reasons for this include:
 Basic cleaning tasks are standardised, with little variation among different enterprises.
 The nature of the job and required standard of performance can be clearly defined and specified in a contract, unlike more technical or professional jobs for which such specification is harder to develop.
Some organizations prefer to outsource work unrelated to their core business in order to save additional salaries and benefits required to manage the work.
 Some organizations may feel uncomfortable dealing with labour relations related to low wage employees; by outsourcing, these labor relations issues are transferred to a contractor whose staff are comfortable and experienced in dealing with these issues, and their approach can benefit from economies of scale.
 If a janitor is unavailable due to sickness or leave, a contractor which employs many janitors can easily assign a substitute. A small organisation which employs one or a few janitors directly will have much more trouble with this.

Demography
Between 17% to 23% of the total undocumented immigrant population living in the United States work in the cleaning industry (and growing at a rate of 1/2% to 1/3% percent per year). In addition to this population offering an abundant source of inexpensive labor, janitorial work is mostly undertaken at night, making it an appealing option for janitorial companies to employ undocumented workers seeking clandestine employment.

In the Netherlands, the number of cleaning companies grew from 5,000 in 2003 to 8,000 in 2008.

See also

 Building superintendent
 Concierge
 Housekeeping
 Property caretaker

References

Further reading

External links

Cleaning and maintenance occupations